Ginette Durand (5 April 1929 — 29 March 2018) was a French gymnast. She competed in seven events at the 1952 Summer Olympics.

References

1929 births
2018 deaths
French female artistic gymnasts
Olympic gymnasts of France
Gymnasts at the 1952 Summer Olympics
Place of birth missing
20th-century French women